Everett Township is an inactive township in Cass County, in the U.S. state of Missouri.

Everett Township was established in 1872, taking its name from Everett, Missouri.

References

Townships in Missouri
Townships in Cass County, Missouri